Parasite Island is a 2019 Philippine drama television series starring Rafael Rosell, Bernard Palanca, Michael Flores, Bianca Manalo, Ria Atayde and Desiree del Valle. The series premiered on ABS-CBN's Yes Weekend! Sunday block from September 8 to December 1, 2019, replacing Hiwaga ng Kambat.

Series overview

Episodes

Season 1

References

Lists of Philippine drama television series episodes